The career of the Swedish composer Dag Wirén (19051986) spanned six decades: his earliest pieces date to 1920, while his final project—the Flute Concertino—was completed in 1972. Today, Wirén is primarily remembered for his popular Serenade for Strings (1937), especially the Marcia (No. 4), which is often performed and recorded as a stand-alone concert piece. In addition to the Serenade, Wirén's most acclaimed works are: his four extant symphonies (Nos. 2–5), written from 1938 to 1964; the Sinfonietta (1934); his four extant string quartets (again, Nos. 2–5), written from 1935 to 1970; and his three concerti, respectively, for cello (1936), violin (1946), and piano (1950). Wirén was also a prolific composer for the stage and the silver screen: he wrote original scores to ten films, three ballets, two radio operettas, and numerous plays—although none of these is particularly well-known.

Orchestral works

Symphonies
 Symphony No. 1 (Op. 3, 1932; withdrawn and never performed)
 Sinfonietta, for orchestra (Op. 7a, 1933–1934, revised 1940; published by Universal Edition in 1951)

 Symphony No. 2, for orchestra (Op. 14, 1938–1939; published by the Swedish Art Music Society in 2000)

Concertante

Other orchestral 
Concert Overture No. 1, for orchestra (Op. 2, 1931; published by /STIM)

 Concert Overture No. 2, for orchestra  (Op. 16, 1940; published by Svensk Musik/STIM)
 Little Suite, for orchestra (Op. 17, 1941; published by )

 Comedy Overture, for orchestra (Op. 21, 1945; published by Svensk Musik/STIM)

 Triptych, for small orchestra (Op. 33, 1958; published by in the Swedish Art Music Society 1959)

 Music for Strings, for string orchestra (Op. 40, 1966–1967; published by )

Stage

Ballet and operetta
 Yellow, Red, and Blue, operetta produced by Swedish Radio (1940; unpublished); libretto by 
 The Happy Solitaire, operetta produced by Swedish Radio (1941; unpublished); libretto by Georg Eliasson

 The Evil Queen / Snow White, ballet for orchestra produced by Swedish Television (Op. 34, 1960; published by Svensk Musik/STIM)

Theatre music
 Madame Bovary, incidental music for ensemble to a production by Harry Rock Hansen of Flaubert's novel at the Blanche Theatre (1939; unpublished)
 The Merchant of Venice, incidental music for ensemble to a production by Alf Sjöberg of Shakespeare's play at the Royal Dramatic Theatre (1943; unpublished)
 Amorina, incidental music for chamber orchestra to a production by Alf Sjöberg of Almqvist's  at the Royal Dramatic Theatre (1951; unpublished)
 Romeo and Juliet, incidental music for chamber orchestra to a production by Alf Sjöberg of Shakespeare's play at the Royal Dramatic Theatre (1953; published by Svensk Musik/STIM)
 A Midsummer Night’s Dream, incidental music for orchestra to a production by Alf Sjöberg of Shakespeare's play at the Royal Swedish Opera (Op. 30, 1955; published by Svensk Musik/STIM)
 The Queen's Tiara, incidental music for ensemble to a production by Alf Sjöberg of Almqvist's novel at the Royal Dramatic Theatre (1957; published by Svensk Musik/STIM)
 Hamlet, incidental music for ensemble to a production by Alf Sjöberg of Shakespeare's play at the Royal Dramatic Theatre (1960; unpublished)
 King John incidental music for ensemble, to a production by Alf Sjöberg of Shakespeare's play at the Royal Dramatic Theatre (1961; published by Svensk Musik/STIM)

Chamber works

Quartets and quintets
 String Quartet No. 1 (undated work; withdrawn)

Duos and trios
 Cello Sonatina No. 1, for cello and piano (Op. 1, 1931; published by Edition Suecia and Svensk Musik/STIM in 1969)

 Miniature Suite No. 1, for cello and piano (Op. 8a, 1934; published by Edition Suecia in 1948)

 Miniature Suite No. 2, for piano trio (violin, cello, and piano) (Op. 8b, 1934; published by Svensk Musik/STIM)
 Violin Sonatina, for violin and piano (Op. 15, 1940; published by the Swedish Art Music Society in 1949)

Solo instrument

Film scores
 Nothing Is Forgotten, original score to a feature film by Åke Ohberg (1942; published by Svensk Musik/STIM)
 Just among Us Thieves, or A Can of Pineapples, original score to a feature film by Olof Molander (1945; unpublished)
 Green Gold, original score to a documentary short by Theodor Christensen (1949)
 Only a Mother, original score to a feature film by Alf Sjöberg (1949; unpublished)
 Miss Julie, original score to a feature film by Alf Sjöberg (1951; unpublished)
 A Lesson in Love, original score to a feature film by Ingmar Bergman (1954; unpublished)
 Wild Birds, original score to a feature film by Alf Sjöberg (1955; unpublished)
 The Phantom Carriage, original score to a feature film by Arne Mattsson (1958; unpublished)
 A Matter of Morals, original score to a feature film by John Cromwell (1960; unpublished)

Vocal
Titania for women’s voices, words by Gustaf Fröding (1942)
Three sea poems a capella, words by Karin Boye (1963)
Livet och skrifterna ("En helig man"), words by Nils Ferlin (1934)
Mitt trollslott står i skogens bryn, words by August Strindberg (1934)
To your bed, Op. 13a, An autumn evening, Op. 13b, words by Erik Axel Karlfeldt (1938)
Jungfru Maria and Malenavisorna, Op. 13 a-b (1938), words by Erik Axel Karlfeldt
Annorstädes vals, words by Alf Henrikson (1965)

Notes, references, and sources

 
 
 
 
 
 
 
 
 

Compositions by Dag Wirén
Wirén, Dag